The meridian 159° west of Greenwich is a line of longitude that extends from the North Pole across the Arctic Ocean, North America, the Pacific Ocean, the Southern Ocean, and Antarctica to the South Pole.

The 159th meridian west forms a great circle with the 21st meridian east.

From Pole to Pole
Starting at the North Pole and heading south to the South Pole, the 159th meridian west passes through:

{| class="wikitable plainrowheaders"
! scope="col" width="130" | Co-ordinates
! scope="col" | Country, territory or sea
! scope="col" | Notes
|-
| style="background:#b0e0e6;" | 
! scope="row" style="background:#b0e0e6;" | Arctic Ocean
| style="background:#b0e0e6;" |
|-
| style="background:#b0e0e6;" | 
! scope="row" style="background:#b0e0e6;" | Chukchi Sea
| style="background:#b0e0e6;" |
|-
| 
! scope="row" | 
| Alaska — Point Franklin
|-
| style="background:#b0e0e6;" | 
! scope="row" style="background:#b0e0e6;" | Chukchi Sea
| style="background:#b0e0e6;" | Peard Bay
|-
| 
! scope="row" | 
| Alaska
|-
| style="background:#b0e0e6;" | 
! scope="row" style="background:#b0e0e6;" | Bering Sea
| style="background:#b0e0e6;" | Bristol Bay
|-
| 
! scope="row" | 
| Alaska — Alaska Peninsula
|-valign="top"
| style="background:#b0e0e6;" | 
! scope="row" style="background:#b0e0e6;" | Pacific Ocean
| style="background:#b0e0e6;" | Passing just east of Chiachi Island, Alaska,  (at ) Passing just west of Mitrofania Island, Alaska,  (at ) Passing just east of Simeonof Island, Alaska,  (at ) Passing just east of Kauai island, Hawaii,  (at ) Passing just west of Manuae atoll,  (at )
|-
| style="background:#b0e0e6;" | 
! scope="row" style="background:#b0e0e6;" | Southern Ocean
| style="background:#b0e0e6;" |
|-
| 
! scope="row" | Antarctica
| Ross Dependency, claimed by 
|-
|}

See also
158th meridian west
160th meridian west

w159 meridian west